Muthanna or Muthana or Muthenna or variant spellings may also refer to:

People

Muthanna
Al-Muthanna ibn Haritha, a Muslim Arab general in the army of the Rashidun Caliphate
I. M. Muthanna, Indian writer, scholar and translator;
Muhammad Abdallah Muthanna (born 1945 or 1947), Yemeni writer
Sengalipuram Muthanna (1830–1893), Hindu religious leader

Muthana
Muthana Khalid (born 1989), Iraqi football player
Hoda Muthana (born 1994), American member of ISIS

Places
Muthanna Governorate, or Al Muthanna Province, Iraq
Muthana, Trivandrum district, Kerala, India
Al-Muthana University, Iraq
Muthenna Air Base, Iraq

Other uses
Al-Muthanna Club, an influential pan-Arab fascist society established in Baghdad ca. 1935 to 1937 which remained active until May 1941
Muthana State Establishment, Iraqi chemical weapons facility
Al Muthanna Task Group, Australian forces in the Multinational force in Iraq
Islamic Muthanna Movement, a Syrian Salafist rebel group based in Daraa that had been active during Syrian Civil War

See also

Islamic Muthanna Movement, a Syrian Salafist rebel group
Mayor Muthanna, 1969 Indian Kannada-language film